Charlie Haigbloom (5 August 1882 – 12 April 1971) was an Australian rules footballer who played with South Melbourne and Essendon in the Victorian Football League (VFL).

Notes

External links 

1882 births
1971 deaths
Australian rules footballers from Victoria (Australia)
Sydney Swans players
Essendon Football Club players